Kanda-koro-kamuy is the Ainu kamuy (god) of the sky. He is the prime originator of Ainu mythology, responsible either directly or indirectly for the creation of all things.

Mythology
While Kanda-koro-kamuy is believed to be a powerful kamuy, he is not presented as a supreme being. He is also in many ways a background figure: while his presence was necessary for the creation of the world, he plays only a small part in subsequent events, often as a mediator. He is considered the overseer and master of the sky, much as Cikap-kamuy is the overseer of the land.

He appointed Mosir-kara-kamuy to shape the earth, preparing it for inhabitation by humankind.

Notes

References
Ashkenazy, Michael. Handbook of Japanese Mythology. Santa Barbara, California: ABC-Clio, 2003.
Etter, Carl. Ainu Folklore: Traditions and Culture of the Vanishing Aborigines of Japan. Chicago: Wilcox and Follett, 1949.
Munro, Neil Gordon. Ainu Creed and Cult. New York: Columbia University Press, 1995.

Ainu kamuy
Creator gods
Sky and weather gods